During the 1946–47 season Hibernian, a football club based in Edinburgh, came second out of 16 clubs in the Scottish First Division.

Scottish First Division

Final League table

Scottish League Cup

Group stage

Group 3 final table

Knockout stage

Scottish Cup

See also
List of Hibernian F.C. seasons

References

External links
Hibernian 1946/1947 results and fixtures, Soccerbase

Hibernian F.C. seasons
Hibernian